Keith Jones is a thirteen-time Emmy Award and four-time Edward R. Murrow Award winning News Anchor, Host, and Reporter for WCAU in Philadelphia, Pennsylvania since July 2012. He anchors NBC10 News Today, which airs Monday through Friday from 4 to 7am, and co-hosts The Lineup on Apple TV and Roku. He also files reports for NBC News.

Early life

Jones grew up in the New Egypt section of Plumsted Township, New Jersey and is one of three boys.  While attending New Egypt High School, Jones was captain of the basketball team and performed the lead in the school musical all four years.  He earned a bachelor's degree in Communications and minors in Journalism and Philosophy from Villanova University.  For three years as an undergraduate, Keith traveled the country with the Villanova Wildcats men's basketball team as a student manager and practice player.  Head Coach Jay Wright (basketball), speaking to Jones, once said, "You were a good enough player that we used you in practice, so you were kind of like half player, half manager... You had good length, you had hops." 

Jones was with the Villanova Men's Basketball team on a flight that made an emergency landing in Providence, Rhode Island in 2005. Jay Wright said the flight attendant started crying before announcing they would make an emergency "crash" landing. Wright said, "I think she was supposed to say water landing because she said that the second time. She actually said crash landing." Jones and Wright said they thought they were going to die. Former Villanova basketball player Randy Foye, who was also on the flight, said, "Just imagine you're riding on a roller coaster, and at the end of the track is a gap, and you know you're going to go off that gap... I can't even explain how scared I was." Allan Ray, a junior guard, said the only sound in the cabin was of people crying. Wright said, "We all came from that thinking we've got a second chance in life -- and I don't mean to be dramatic." According to the New York Times, the pilot somehow swung the airplane back to the airport and landed safely on an icy runway lined with emergency vehicles. According to ESPN, the cause was apparently an instrument failure that affected the plane's ability to climb.

Jones has said that his basketball responsibilities caused him to miss half his classes every year.  During his junior year, his roommate was NBA All-Star Kyle Lowry.  He also worked as an intern in the Sports Department at WCAU in Philadelphia.

Broadcast history
Jones was hired as a Reporter for WHSV in Harrisonburg, Virginia. After one year, he was promoted to anchoring weekends and then weekday mornings. The station was awarded "Best Morning News Show" by the Virginia Association of Broadcasters.

After three years in Virginia, Jones was hired as an Anchor and Reporter for WTAE in Pittsburgh, Pennsylvania. Jones covered stories including the dedication of the Flight 93 Memorial in Shanksville, the contentious 2010 Pennsylvania Governor's race, and the trial of former Penn State assistant football coach Jerry Sandusky.

Jones joined WCAU in Philadelphia as the Weekday Morning Anchor in July 2012, making him the youngest anchor (27) in the Philadelphia area. He also anchored the 11:00am hour-long weekday newscast. Jones has covered the London Olympic Games, the sentencing of former Penn State football coach Jerry Sandusky, Superstorm Sandy, the 2013 U.S. Open (golf), the Boston Marathon bombing, and the deadly tornadoes in Moore, Oklahoma. In 2015, Jones reported live from Super Bowl XLIX in Glendale, AZ, and later that year, played a vital role in NBC10s coverage of Pope Francis’ historic visit to Philadelphia. Since 2014, Jones has covered the NCAA Division I men's basketball tournament, including the two national championship runs of the 2015–16 Villanova Wildcats men's basketball team and 2017–18 Villanova Wildcats men's basketball team.

In 2016, Jones appeared in the nationally televised musical Hairspray Live! on NBC.

He competed on the American Ninja Warrior course in Philadelphia twice. In 2018, Jones covered the 2018 Winter Olympics in South Korea, for which he won an Emmy. During the trip, Jones stepped into North Korea at the Korean Demilitarized Zone. In 2021, Jones traveled to Tokyo, Japan to cover the 2020 Summer Olympics.

Recognition 
In 2014, Jones was honored with Villanova University's annual Ethos Award, which recognizes an alumnus who serves as a role model to students by demonstrating character, service, and excellence in the field of communication.  The same year, Jones was awarded Villanova University College of Liberal Arts and Sciences' Young Alumni Medallion, bestowed upon one University alum annually who excels in his/her professional endeavors and demonstrates ongoing service to the community and the University.

In 2017, BuzzFeed ranked Jones among the "50 Hottest News Anchors in the World".

In 2018, Jones' was honored with Villanova University's Young Alumni Medal, which recognizes an alumnus/a who has reached a significant level of achievement in his/her profession and who is a model of the quality and caliber of today's Villanova student. The award honors alumni who have made outstanding contributions to one or more areas of society, including professional, academic, and service to the college.

In 2021, Jones won the Mid-Atlantic Emmy Award for Outstanding Anchor.

Other activities
Jones has taught as an adjunct professor of Broadcast Journalism at his alma mater Villanova University since 2013. In 2019, Jones also taught a Master Class at The College of New Jersey, during which he said, “I made every mistake in the book. I think there’s tremendous value in knowing that you learn more from failure than you do success — so go and fail and fail and fail.” In his spare time he mentors high school and college students.

Jones serves on the board of directors for Main Line Deputy Dog, which is an organization that helps people with physical challenges or mental health concerns train their own dogs to be fully certified service dogs. He also serves on the boards of Turning Points for Children, which supports families in raising safe, healthy, educated and strong children by partnering with caregivers, and the Philadelphia Fireman's Hall Museum.

He actively volunteers for the American Red Cross of Southeastern PA since 2012.  He has hosted the regional organization's Red Ball since March 2014.  He also volunteers with Villanova's Office of Disability Services.

Jones plays guitar, bass, piano, and drums and has written more than 40 original songs.  In early March 2007, he entered the "Jersey Guy Idol" contest on WKXW (101.5 FM, "New Jersey 101.5") with hosts Craig Carton and Ray Rossi. He placed second out of 32 contestants selected to go on-air and was the top male performer.  Later that year at Villanova, he competed in the WXVU Battle of the Bands, placing third.  He also independently released an EP, titled "The Long Way Home."

Personal life
In 2016, Jones' longtime girlfriend Cara McCollum, 24, died at Cooper University Hospital a week after sustaining head injures in a one-car accident on an icy Route 55 in Pittsgrove Township, Salem County, on February 15.  A funeral was held in her hometown of Forrest City, Arkansas and a memorial service was held in Ocean City, New Jersey.  Jones delivered the eulogy at both occasions.

Jones later said, "My late girlfriend Cara taught me it’s not the years in my life that count, but the life in my years.”

Jones awards the Cara McCollum Scholarship every year at the Miss New Jersey Pageant.

Jones has a Miniature American Shepherd named Charlie, who he called "his shadow." He has said his dog gave him a new outlook while he was grieving, “He’s become everything to me. Dogs are amazing. They have this amazing sense and amazing ability to understand how you’re feeling before you even realize you’re feeling it.” In 2016, the National Dog Show named Charlie its official "spokesdog" after they saw Jones post about him on social media.

Jones announced his engagement to his fiancée, Holly Harrar, over Labor Day weekend in September of 2022.

Notes

References 
"Delco Times: ZOREN: Channel 10 keeping up with the Joneses", http://www.delcotimes.com/articles/2012/07/02/entertainment/doc4ff11174c27ef309041759.txt
"Post-Gazette: Keith Jones takes Philly anchor job", http://www.post-gazette.com/stories/ae/tv-radio/keith-jones-

Living people
Emmy Award winners
People from Plumsted Township, New Jersey
Villanova University alumni
Television anchors from Philadelphia
Year of birth missing (living people)